The Rogersville Historic District is a historic district in Rogersville, Tennessee, the county seat of Hawkins County. It is both a local historic district and a National Register of Historic Places historic district.

The local historic district established by the Town of Rogersville to safeguard, preserve, and protect hundreds of unique and historically significant structures in and around the town's downtown area. It comprises numerous neighborhoods and business areas, with architecture and significant historical events occurring throughout the history of the town, since its settlement by Davy Crockett's grandparents in 1775.

The street plan of the core of the district, which centers on Rogersville's commercial and governmental hub, was designed by the town's founder, Joseph Rogers, when he petitioned the North Carolina General Assembly to establish a town at Hawkins Court House in 1786.

The local historic district is administered by the Town of Rogersville's Historic Preservation Commission, a governmental body.

It includes numerous historically significant structures, including:
Hale Springs Inn, c. 1824
Hawkins County Courthouse, c. 1836
Overton Lodge, c. 1840

The entire Rogersville Historic District is listed on the National Register of Historic Places.

References

External links
 Town of Rogersville official website
 Rogersville Heritage Association official website

Rogersville, Tennessee
Historic districts on the National Register of Historic Places in Tennessee
Geography of Hawkins County, Tennessee
Buildings and structures in Hawkins County, Tennessee
National Register of Historic Places in Hawkins County, Tennessee